Okpella is a clan situated along Benin-Abuja federal high way. Going by the last National Census figures, it has the population of 500,000,  and is one of the three main towns that make up Etsako East Local Government Area of Edo State. Okpella is known for its natural sedimentary rock based mineral resources, which include limestone, calcium, and granite, feldspar, talc, clay, marble, etc.

the Late Clan Head, Andrew Yesufu Eshioramhe Dirisu who reigned for 48 years came from Ogute Sub-Clan. During colonial rule, arising out of personality clashes between Chief Sado who was the statutory Clan Head of OKPELLA clan and Afegbua the clan was sub-divided into two, namely Ogute and Oteku  as sub-clans. While the Ogute sub-clans has prominent villages like Ogute, Imiekuri etc, Oteku sub-clan has two villages, Iddo and Komunio; both plays host to Bua Cement Company Plc and Dangote Group of Company Plc. Okpella was the District Head of the then Kabba Province.

Since the period of Chief SADO-IGBA IKOR who was succeeded by Oba Obinogbe, Okpella has been administered as one entity. However, between 1964 and 1971 when the immediate past paramount ruler  Alhaji Andrew Yesufu Eshioramhe Dirisu, a Justice of the Peace; assumed the throne with the title of Okuokpellagbe of Okpella, Chief Giwa Enamudu, the village head of Komunio, headed the OTEKU sub clan, while Chief Alabi headed the OGUTE sub clan. The two sub clans make up the two ruling houses of the clan, the headship of which rotates or oscillates among them. Alhaji Dr A. Y. E. Dirisu joined his ancestors in year 2019 in February and the clan observed the three months traditional mourning period before electing a new clan head. The appointment/election of the clan head is regulated by the Chieftaincy Declaration Law of Bendel State, 1981, as applicable to present  Edo State. It is now turn of Oteku Sub-Clan to produce the next Clan Head of Okpella, the Late Clan Head, Andrew Yesufu Eshioramhe Dirisu  who reigned for 48 years came from Ogute Sub-Clan.

 The town play host to  two Cement factories namely:  BUA Cement Company Plc and DANGOTE Group of Company Plc as well as the defunct Edo Cement Company Ltd. While Abdulsalam Rabiu founded  Bua  Cement Factory Plc,  Aliko Dangote founded Dangote Group of Company Plc.  These are the only cement factories Okpella Clan and in the old Midwest Region and the present Edo state. The defunct Edo Cement Factory  was established by the Dennis Osadebey and Hon. Musa Godfrey administration in 1964, with the late  Chief Ikhumetse Olowu, as its pioneer Chairman. Okpella, in view of the abundance of other solid minerals, is home to several granite- and marble-making industries.

Its Ewo market, located at Okugbe in Oteku sub-clan and on the busy Benin-Abuja Road and congregates every fourth day. Okpella is a natural town with citizens who share a communal bond prevalent in most African societies, the town also consists of Muslims and Christians who live peacefully among themselves despite their religion backgrounds. The origin of okpella  people was not documented, it was preserved in oral traditions like African people.

Okpella language is a dialect of Bini and very  strongest mark of their Edo Bini legacy and heritage. The name Okpella was  derived from the Bini word Okpea meaning man, and Okpea na means “man run”, or this could also mean “this man”. It is Okpea na was now changed  to Okpella.

Tradition
Okpella is sub divided into two major subdivisions which correspond to east and west which represent the two sons of Ekpola, the one who founded the clan. Western Okpella include five villages, and three  eastern Okpella. The remaining village represents the descendants of earlier settlers. The Okpella people believe in a supreme deity called Eshinegba, which is known as creator of all things both in the physical world (agbo) The remaining village represents the descendants of earlier settlers. The Okpella people believe in a supreme deity called Eshinegba, which is known as creator of all things both in the physical world (agbo) and the spirit world (ilimi).

Villages 
Afokpella, Awuyemi, Iddo, Imiegele, Imekuri, Ogute-Oke, Okugbe, Oku

Notes

References 

Populated places in Edo State